Datuk Seri Salahuddin bin Ayub (Jawi: صلاح الدين بن أيوب; born 1 December 1961) is a Malaysian politician who has served as the Minister of Domestic Trade and Living Costs in the Pakatan Harapan (PH) administration under Prime Minister Anwar Ibrahim since December 2022 and Minister of Agriculture and Agro-based Industry in the PH administration under former Prime Minister Mahathir Mohamad from May 2018 to his resignation and the collapse of the PH administration in February 2020. He has also served as the Member of Parliament (MP) for the Pulai since May 2018, Kubang Kerian from March 2004 to May 2013 and Member of the Johor State Legislative Assembly (MLA) for Simpang Jeram since May 2018. He is a member of the National Trust Party (AMANAH),  a component party of PH opposition coalition. He has served as the 1st and founding Deputy President of AMANAH since September 2015 and State Chairman of PH of Johor since September 2022.He was previously a member, Youth Chief and Vice-President of the Malaysian Islamic Party (PAS), a former component party of the former Pakatan Rakyat (PR) and Barisan Alternatif (BA) opposition coalitions.    But he together with a few other progressive leaders led by Mohamad referred as G18 were ousted during the 2015 PAS Muktamar which had launched Gerakan Harapan Baru (GHB) and founded AMANAH.

Early life and education
Salahuddin was born on 1 December 1961 in Kampung Serkat, Tanjung Piai, Pontian, Johor and to an ethnic Malay-Chinese peranakan parentage. He was educated at the Serkat English Primary School, Pontian (1967-1973). Later, he continued to study at the lower secondary level at the Teluk Kerang English Secondary School, Pontian (1974-1976) and at Sri Perhentian Secondary School, Pontian (1977-1978) until completion of Form 5, pursuing a 6th grade at Sekolah Menengah Kebangsaan Datuk Penggawa Barat, Pontian (1979-1980). He also attended religious education at Johor State Religious School with a Special Class of Class in 1977. After graduating from school, he pursued a Diploma in Business Administration at Tunku Abdul Rahman College (KTAR) (1982-1983) and went on to stage Bachelor of BSc. (Human Development Science) at Universiti Putra Malaysia (UPM) in 1984.

Career and sosial activism
He began his early career as Financial officer at MUI Bank in 1980, before venturing into sosial and youth activism in Angkatan Belia Islam Malaysia (ABIM) as Pontian branch Secretary (1981-1983) and politics in 1983.

Politics
Salahuddin earlier involved in PAS since 1999 and was selected by PAS to contest the Johor State Legislative Assembly state seat of Benut in the 1999 general election but lost. He was the picked to contest federal parliamentary seat of Kubang Kerian, Kelantan in the 2004 general election which he had won. He was re-elected again in 2008 general election. For the 2013 election he returned to his home state of Johor to contest the parliamentary seat of Pulai, losing to its Barisan Nasional incumbent Nur Jazlan Mohamed. He also contested, and lost the Johor seat of Nusajaya. In the 2018 general election, Salahuddin for the first time contested under AMANAH of Pakatan Harapan and won both the federal parliamentary seat of Pulai and the Johor state seat of Simpang Jeram.

PAS
 In 1983, PAS Pontian Vice-President (1983-1987), PAS Pontian Youth chief (1987-1989), Johor PAS Youth chief (1989-1999), PAS Youth Youth Exco (1991-1995) PAS Youth Information Chief (1995-1997), Central PAS Youth Council Secretary (1997-1999), PAS Youth vice-chairman (1999-2001), Deputy Head of PAS Youth Council (2001-2003), PAS Youth chief (2003-2009), Vice President of PAS (2009-2015).
 Johor PAS information chief (1997-2001), Johor PAS Liaison Secretary (2001), Johor PAS deputy commissioner (2001-2003) dan Member of the Central PAS Committee (2001-2003).
 Lujnah Agriculture Head of the PAS Youth Center (1993-1995), Lujnah Head of Information and Da'wah PAS Youth Center (1995-1997), Head of the National Relations Committee of the PAS Youth Center (1999-2001), Head of the International Lujnah of the PAS Youth Center (2001-2003) and Head of Lujnah User and Environment PAS Center (2001-2003).
 Contested in the Pulai parliamentary constituency, Johor and Nusajaya State Assembly (now known as Iskandar City) at the 2013 Malaysian general election but lost both seats to Barisan Nasional candidates.

AMANAH
 Appointed as Deputy President of AMANAH in 2015.
 Won the Simpang Jeram state seat in the 2018 Malaysian general election.
 Won the Pulai parliamentary seat in the 2018 Malaysian general election.

Pakatan Harapan
 Appointed as Vice President of Pakatan Harapan on 22 September 2015.

Experience
 Participated in the Malaysian Youth Associations Association to support the Lebanese people by all the leaders of the National Political Party in 2006.
 Prime Debate with UMNO's Nazri Abdul Aziz in 2003.
 Detained at Kajang Prison in 2001 for being involved in an illegal assembly of Ops Cricket Israel at University of Malaya in 1997.
 Leader of the humanitarian mission of the PAS Youth Council to Kosova (1999), Afghanistan (2002), Vietnam (2002), Iraq (2003) and Lebanon (2006).
 Malaysian Government Representative while being Member of Parliament to sit on the Special Committee of Parliament on Unity and PLN.
 Member of the International Parliamentary Organization (IPO) and member of the Caucus of the Defense of Humanity Standing.

Election results

Personal life 
He married his wife, Fatimah Taha, in 1985 and the couple have 6 children.

Honours

Honours of Malaysia
  :
  Officer of the Order of the Defender of State (DSPN) – Dato’ (2018)
  :
  Grand Commander of the Exalted Order of Malacca (DGSM) – Datuk Seri (2019)

References

External links
 

Living people
1961 births
People from Johor
Malaysian people of Malay descent
Malaysian Muslims
National Trust Party (Malaysia) politicians
Former Malaysian Islamic Party politicians
Government ministers of Malaysia
Agriculture ministers of Malaysia
Members of the Dewan Rakyat
Members of the Johor State Legislative Assembly
University of Putra Malaysia alumni
21st-century Malaysian politicians